Luigi Agnolin (21 March 1943 – 29 September 2018) was an Italian football referee. He was mostly known for supervising four matches in the FIFA World Cup, three in 1986 and one in 1990. He also refereed the 1988 European Cup Final between PSV Eindhoven and S.L. Benfica.

In addition to his two World Cup tournaments, Agnolin also served as a referee in qualifiers for the World Cups of 1982, 1986, and 1990. He officiated in qualifying for Euro 1984. Agnolin is known to have worked as a FIFA referee during the period from 1980 to 1990.

Agnolin was also a futsal referee, officiating at the 1989 FIFA Futsal World Championship in the Netherlands.

In 2012, he was inducted into the Italian Football Hall of Fame.

References

Profile

1943 births
2018 deaths
People from Bassano del Grappa
Italian football referees
FIFA World Cup referees
1990 FIFA World Cup referees
1986 FIFA World Cup referees
Sportspeople from the Province of Vicenza